Philodendron verrucosum is a species of flowering plant in the family Araceae. It is native to Costa Rica, Panama, Colombia, Ecuador and Peru, and is a hemiepiphyte climbing plant. This Philodendron is kept by houseplant collectors for its unique appearance, with foliage that has slightly wavy edges, white veins, and flushes of reddish hues, as well as hairy bristles along its stems.

References

verrucosum
Flora of Central America
Flora of South America
Plants described in 1856